The 1986–87 English Hockey League season took place from September 1986 until May 1987.

The season culminated in the National Inter League Championship for men which brought together the winners of their respective regions. The Men's championship was won by Slough

The Men's Hockey Association Cup was won by Southgate and the Women's Cup (National Club Championship finals) was won by Ealing.

Men's National Inter League Championship finals 
(Held at Prescot, Merseyside, May 2–3)

Group A

Group B

Semi-finals & Final 

Slough
Jon Clark (Paul Loudon sub), Paul Barber, Kartar Davatwal, Manjit Flora, Kalli Saini, Ken Partington, Sutinder (Suti) Khehar (capt), Bhaji Flora, Chris Maskery, Sheikh Imtiaz (S Ali sub), Steve Partington (R Charlesworth)
Old Loughtonians
C Greenwood, K Hansen (N Thompson sub), M Donnelly, P Anderson, Chris Gladman, P Morris, S Ashton, Nick Thompson (M Hickling sub), D Camilleri (capt), Julian Halls, J Barber

Men's Cup (En-Tout-Cas Sports Surfaces Hockey Association Cup)

Quarter-finals

Semi-finals

Final 
(Held at Old Loughtonians, Chigwell on 17 May)

Southgate
David Owen, Richard Dodds, Mike Spray, Chris Picken, Peter Boxell, Andrew Western, Paul Moulton (Rupert Welch sub), John Shaw, David Thomas, Steve Batchelor, Sean Kerly
Slough
Jon Clark, Paul Barber, Kartar Davatwal, Manjit Flora, Sutinder (Suti) Khehar, Ken Partington, Kalli Saini, Bhaji Flora, Chris Maskery, Sheikh Imtiaz, Kuki Dhak

Women's Cup (NatWest National Club Championship finals) 
(April 25–26)

Final

References 

1986
field hockey
field hockey
1987 in field hockey
1986 in field hockey